This is a list of Montreal Expos and Washington Nationals owners and executives.

(This Major League Baseball franchise played as the Montreal Expos from 1969 through 2004 and has played as the Washington Nationals since 2005.)

Owners

Montreal Expos

Washington Nationals

Presidents

General Managers

Montreal Expos

Washington Nationals

Other executives

Montreal Expos

Washington Nationals

External links
Baseball America: Executive Database

Washington Nationals
Owners and executives